The 16th Cook Islands Parliament is the current term of the Parliament of the Cook Islands. Its composition was determined by the 2022 elections on 1 August 2022.

Initial party standings

Members

Initial MPs

Summary of changes
 Independent MP Stephen Matapo joined the Cook Islands Party on 25 August 2022.

References

Politics of the Cook Islands
2022 in the Cook Islands